Woodford railway station is located on the Main Western line in New South Wales, Australia. It serves the Blue Mountains village of Woodford opening on 11 July 1868 as Buss' Platform, being renamed Woodford on 1 June 1871.

Platforms & services
Woodford has one island platform with two sides. It is serviced by NSW TrainLink Blue Mountains Line services travelling from Sydney Central to Lithgow.

Transport links
Blue Mountains Transit operate two routes via Woodford station:
685H: Springwood to Hazelbrook
690K: Springwood to Katoomba

References

External links

Woodford station details Transport for New South Wales

Railway stations in Australia opened in 1868
Regional railway stations in New South Wales
Short-platform railway stations in New South Wales, 6 cars
Main Western railway line, New South Wales